Paweł Mąciwoda Jastr-Zebski (born on 20 February 1967) is a Polish bassist who began playing with the hard rock band Scorpions in 2003 and became an official member in January 2004.

Early career 
Born in Wieliczka, Mąciwoda began playing bass guitar semi-professionally at the age of 15 with his father's encouragement. His young age on the rock and roll circuit earned him the nickname "Baby", but within a few years Mąciwoda was touring Europe with a jazz fusion band called the Little Egoists, and for overlapping periods of time performed as a member of the avant-garde rock bands Düpą and Püdelsi, both based in Kraków. At about the same time he also released a solo album entitled Radio Wieliczka. His other band credits during his early years included the popular jazz-rock band Walk Away, headed by the world-famous violinist Michał Urbaniak and lead vocalist Urszula Dudziak, with whom he recorded the album Magic Lady.

Current projects 
In 2009, he appeared on the WU-HAE's Opera Nowohucka album alongside such artists as Grzegorz Markowski, Maciej Maleńczuk and Olaf Deriglasoff.

As of 2011, Mąciwoda has been collaborating with friend and fellow musician Efrem Wilder in the outfit Stirwater. The name Stirwater is derived from the English translation of Mąciwoda last name "Mąciwoda". The collaboration between musicians ended after a couple of years but they managed to get a single recorded. It was called "Water water" and it was number two for a couple of weeks on the Polish radio station Trójka in the summer of 2012. After that the band broke up but the project Stirwater is continued as he is playing and recording with fellow musicians from all over the world e.g. Florian Hofer from Germany or Atma Anur from UK.

See also 

 List of Poles
 Music of Poland

References 

Scorpions (band) members
Polish heavy metal bass guitarists
Polish bass guitarists
Jazz fusion bass guitarists
Rock bass guitarists
Blues bass guitarists
Folk bass guitarists
1967 births
Living people
People from Wieliczka
Polish male guitarists
Male bass guitarists